Pierre Courant (12 September 1897, Le Havre, Seine-Maritime – 22 March 1965, Le Havre) was a French politician. He belonged first to the Independent Republicans (1946–1955) and then to the National Centre of Independents and Peasants (1956–1962).
He was, in succession, the minister of Reconstruction and Urban Development, minister of Housing, and minister of Budget.

References 

1897 births
1965 deaths
Politicians from Le Havre
National Centre of Independents and Peasants politicians
French Ministers of Budget
Members of the Constituent Assembly of France (1945)
Members of the Constituent Assembly of France (1946)
Deputies of the 1st National Assembly of the French Fourth Republic
Deputies of the 2nd National Assembly of the French Fourth Republic
Deputies of the 3rd National Assembly of the French Fourth Republic
Deputies of the 1st National Assembly of the French Fifth Republic